The Dendra panoply or Dendra armour is an example of Mycenaean-era panoply (full-body armor) made of bronze plates uncovered in the village of Dendra in the Argolid, Greece.

Description 
Several elements of body armour (body cuirass, shoulder guards, breast plates and lower protection plates) from the late Mycenaean period have been found at Thebes, some bronze bands have been also found at Mycenae and Phaistos. Bronze scales were found at Mycenae and Troy; scale armour, the oldest form of metal body armor, was used widely throughout the eastern Mediterranean and the Near East. In May 1960 Swedish archaeologists discovered the earliest example of a beaten bronze cuirass at Dendra, dated at the end of the fifteenth century BC. It forms part of the Late Helladic (LHIIIa) Dendra Panoply, which consists of fifteen separate pieces of bronze sheet, held together with leather thongs, that encased the wearer from neck to knees. The panoply includes both greaves and lower arm-guards. The arm-guard is unique but greaves, probably made of linen, are often depicted in late Mycenaean art. The few bronze examples that have been found only covered the shins and may have been worn over linen ones, as much for show of status Diane Fortenberry has suggested, as for protection. Although we have only this one complete panoply to date, armor of similar type appears as an ideogram on Linear B tablets from Knossos (Sc series), Pylos (Sh series) and Tiryns (Si series).

The panoply’s cuirass consists of two pieces, for the chest and back. These are joined on the left side by a hinge. There is a bronze loop on the right side of the front-plate and a similar loop on each shoulder. Large shoulder-guards fit over the cuirass. Two triangular plates are attached to the shoulder-guards and gave protection to the wearer’s armpits when his arms were in the raised position. There is also a deep neck-guard. The Linear B ideogram depicting armour of this type makes the neck-guard clearly discernible, and protection by a high bronze collar was a typical feature of Near Eastern body armour. Three pairs of curved plates hang from the waist to protect the groin and the thighs. All these pieces are made of beaten bronze sheet and are backed with leather and loosely fastened by ox-hide thongs to allow some degree of movement. The complete panoply thus forms a cumbersome tubular suit of armour, which fully protects the neck and torso, and extends down to the knees. It appears that lower arm-guards and a set of greaves further protected the warrior, all made of bronze, as fragments of these were also found in the grave at Dendra. Slivers of boars’ tusks were also discovered, which once made up a boars’-tusk helmet.

The figures on the Warrior Vase (Mycenae, ca 1200 BC, National Archaeological Museum, Athens) are wearing body armor. However, this armor is different. It may be either an embossed waist-length leather corslet with a fringed leather apron that reaches to mid-thigh and possible shoulder-guards, very much like that worn by the Peoples of the Sea depicted on the mortuary temple of Ramesses III (died c. 1155 BC) at Medinet Habu, Lower Egypt, or, alternatively, the body armour may be a ‘bell’ corselet of beaten bronze sheet, a type also found in central Europe at that time.

Notes

References
Paul Åstrom, The Cuirass Tomb and Other Finds at Dendra Part I: The Chamber Tombs (Studies in Mediterranean Archaeology, iv) (Göteborg) 1977. The official publication.
Nicolas Grguric, The Mycenaeans: c 1650–1100 BC, "the Dendra armour"  (Osprey)
Anthony Snodgrass, Early Greek Armour and Weapons: From the End of the Bronze Age to 600 B.C. (Edinburgh/Chicago) 1964: 71–73, 76f.

External links

Dendra panoply, Nafplion Museum, on YouTube.

15th-century BC works
1960 archaeological discoveries
Body armor
Ancient Greek military equipment
Mycenaean Greece
Archaeological discoveries in Greece
Individual suits of armour